Dame Enid Diana Elizabeth Rigg  (20 July 193810 September 2020) was an English actress of stage and screen. Her roles include Emma Peel in the TV series The Avengers (1965–1968); Countess Teresa di Vicenzo, wife of James Bond, in On Her Majesty's Secret Service (1969); Olenna Tyrell in Game of Thrones (2013–2017); and the title role in Medea in the West End in 1993 followed by Broadway a year later. 
 
Rigg made her professional stage debut in 1957 in The Caucasian Chalk Circle and joined the Royal Shakespeare Company in 1959. She made her Broadway debut in Abelard & Heloise in 1971. Her role as Emma Peel made her a sex symbol. For her role in Medea, both in London and New York, she won the 1994 Tony Award for Best Actress in a Play. She was made a CBE in 1988 and a Dame in 1994 for services to drama.

Rigg appeared in numerous TV series and films, playing Helena in A Midsummer Night's Dream (1968); Lady Holiday in The Great Muppet Caper (1981); and Arlena Marshall in Evil Under the Sun (1982). She won the BAFTA TV Award for Best Actress for the BBC miniseries Mother Love (1989) and an Emmy Award for her role as Mrs. Danvers in Rebecca (1997). Her other television credits include You, Me and the Apocalypse (2015), Detectorists (2015), the Doctor Who episode "The Crimson Horror" (2013) with her daughter Rachael Stirling, and playing Mrs Pumphrey in All Creatures Great and Small (2020). Her final role was in Edgar Wright's 2021 psychological horror film Last Night in Soho, completed just before her death.

Early life and education
Enid Diana Elizabeth Rigg was born on 20 July 1938 in Doncaster, then in the West Riding of Yorkshire (now in South Yorkshire), to Louis and Beryl Hilda Rigg (née Helliwell). She had a brother four years her senior. Her father was born in Yorkshire, worked in engineering, and moved to India to work for the railway to take advantage of the career opportunities there. Her mother moved back to England for Rigg's birth. Between the ages of two months and eight years, Rigg lived in Bikaner, Rajasthan, India, where her father worked his way up to become a railway executive in the Bikaner State Railway. She spoke Hindi as her second language in those years.

She was later sent back to England to attend a boarding school, Fulneck Girls School, in a Moravian settlement near Pudsey. Rigg hated her boarding school where she felt like a fish out of water, but believed that Yorkshire played a greater part in shaping her character than India did. She trained as an actress at the Royal Academy of Dramatic Art from 1955 to 1957, where her classmates included Glenda Jackson and Siân Phillips.

Theatre career
Rigg's career in film, television and the theatre was wide-ranging, including roles in the Royal Shakespeare Company between 1959 and 1967. Her professional debut was as Natasha Abashwilli in the RADA production of The Caucasian Chalk Circle at the York Festival in 1957.

She returned to the stage in the Ronald Millar play Abelard and Heloïse in London in 1970 and made her Broadway debut with the play in 1971, in which she appeared nude with Keith Michell.  She earned the first of three Tony Award nominations for Best Actress in a Play. She received her second nomination in 1975, for The Misanthrope. A member of the National Theatre Company at the Old Vic from 1972 to 1975, Rigg took leading roles in premiere productions of two Tom Stoppard plays, Dorothy Moore in Jumpers (National Theatre, 1972) and Ruth Carson in Night and Day (Phoenix Theatre, 1978).

In 1982, she appeared in the musical Colette, based on the life of the French writer and created by Tom Jones and Harvey Schmidt, but it closed during an American tour en route to Broadway. In 1987, she took a leading role in the West End production of Stephen Sondheim's musical Follies. In the 1990s, she had triumphs with roles at the Almeida Theatre in Islington, including Medea in 1992 (which transferred to the Wyndham's Theatre in 1993 and then Broadway in 1994, for which she received the Tony Award for Best Actress), Mother Courage at the National Theatre in 1995 and Who's Afraid of Virginia Woolf? at the Almeida Theatre in 1996 (which transferred to the Aldwych Theatre in October 1996).

In 2004, she appeared as Violet Venable in Sheffield Theatres' production of Tennessee Williams's play Suddenly Last Summer, which transferred to the Albery Theatre. In 2006, she appeared at the Wyndham's Theatre in London's West End in a drama entitled Honour which had a limited but successful run. In 2007, she appeared as Huma Rojo in the Old Vic's production of All About My Mother, adapted by Samuel Adamson and based on the film of the same title directed by Pedro Almodóvar.

She appeared in 2008 in The Cherry Orchard at the Chichester Festival Theatre, returning there in 2009 to star in Noël Coward's Hay Fever. In 2011, she played Mrs Higgins in Pygmalion at the Garrick Theatre, opposite Rupert Everett and Kara Tointon, having played Eliza Doolittle 37 years earlier at the Albery Theatre.

In February 2018, she returned to Broadway in the non-singing role of Mrs Higgins in My Fair Lady. She commented, "I think it's so special. When I was offered Mrs Higgins, I thought it was just such a lovely idea." She received her fourth Tony nomination for the role.

Film and television career
From 1965 to 1968, Rigg appeared in the British 1960s television series The Avengers (1961–69) opposite Patrick Macnee as John Steed, playing the secret agent Emma Peel in 51 episodes. She replaced Elizabeth Shepherd at very short notice when Shepherd was dropped from the role after filming two episodes. Rigg auditioned for the role on a whim, without ever having seen the programme. Although she was hugely successful in the series, she disliked the lack of privacy that it brought and was not comfortable in her position as a sex symbol. In an interview with The Guardian in 2019, Rigg stated that "becoming a sex symbol overnight had shocked (her)". She also did not like the way that she was treated by production company ABC Weekend TV.

For her second series, she held out for a pay rise from £150 a week to £450; she said in 2019 – when gender pay inequality was very much in the news – that "not one woman in the industry supported me... Neither did Patrick [Macnee, her co-star]... I was painted as this mercenary creature by the press when all I wanted was equality. It's so depressing that we are still talking about the gender pay gap." She did not stay for a third year. Patrick Macnee noted that Rigg had later told him that she considered Macnee and her driver to be her only friends on the set. On the big screen, she became a Bond girl in On Her Majesty's Secret Service (1969), playing Tracy Bond, James Bond's only wife, opposite George Lazenby. She said she took the role with the hope that she would become better known in the United States. In 1973–74, she starred in a short-lived US sitcom called Diana.

Her other films from this period include The Assassination Bureau (1969), Julius Caesar (1970), The Hospital (1971), Theatre of Blood (1973), In This House of Brede (1975), based on the book by Rumer Godden, and A Little Night Music (1977). She appeared as the title character in The Marquise (1980), a television adaptation of a play by Noël Coward. She appeared in the Yorkshire Television production of Ibsen's Hedda Gabler (1981) in the title role, and as Lady Holiday in the film The Great Muppet Caper (also 1981). The following year she received acclaim for her performance as Arlena Marshall in the film adaptation of Agatha Christie's Evil Under the Sun, sharing barbs with her character's old rival, played by Maggie Smith.

She appeared as Regan, the king's treacherous second daughter, in a Granada Television production of King Lear (1983) which starred Laurence Olivier in the title role. As Lady Dedlock, she co-starred with Denholm Elliott in a television version of Dickens' Bleak House (BBC, 1985) and played the Evil Queen, Snow White's evil stepmother, in the Cannon Movie Tales's film adaptation of Snow White (1987). In 1989, she played Helena Vesey in Mother Love for the BBC; her portrayal of an obsessive mother who was prepared to do anything, even murder, to keep control of her son won Rigg the 1990 BAFTA for Best Television Actress.

In 1995, she appeared in a film adaptation for television based on Danielle Steel's Zoya as Evgenia, the main character's grandmother.

She appeared on television as Mrs Danvers in Rebecca (1997), winning an Emmy, as well as the PBS production Moll Flanders, and as the amateur detective Mrs Bradley in The Mrs Bradley Mysteries. In this BBC series, first aired in 2000, she played Gladys Mitchell's detective, Dame Beatrice Adela Le Strange Bradley, an eccentric old woman who worked for Scotland Yard as a pathologist. The series was not a critical success and did not return for a second season.

From 1989 until 2003, she hosted the PBS television series Mystery!, shown in the United States by PBS broadcaster WGBH, taking over from Vincent Price, her co-star in Theatre of Blood.

She also appeared in the second series of Ricky Gervais's comedy Extras, alongside Harry Potter star Daniel Radcliffe, and in the 2006 film The Painted Veil, in which she played a nun.

In 2013, she appeared in an episode of Doctor Who in a Victorian era-based story called "The Crimson Horror" alongside her daughter Rachael Stirling, Matt Smith and Jenna-Louise Coleman. The episode had been specially written for her and her daughter by Mark Gatiss and aired as part of series 7. It was not the first time mother and daughter had appeared in the same production – that was in the 2000 NBC film In the Beginning – but the first time she had worked directly with her daughter and the first time in her career her roots were accessed to find a Doncaster, Yorkshire, accent.

The same year, Rigg was cast in a recurring role in the third season of the HBO series Game of Thrones, portraying Lady Olenna Tyrell, a witty and sarcastic political mastermind popularly known as the Queen of Thorns, the paternal grandmother of regular character Margaery Tyrell. Her performance was well received by critics and audiences alike, and earned her an Emmy nomination for Outstanding Guest Actress in a Drama Series for the 65th Primetime Emmy Awards in 2013. She reprised her role in season four of Game of Thrones, and in July 2014 received another Guest Actress Emmy nomination. In 2015 and 2016, she again reprised the role in seasons five and six in an expanded role from the books. In 2015 and 2018, she received two additional Guest Actress Emmy nominations. The character was killed off in the seventh season, with Rigg's final performance receiving wide critical acclaim. In April 2019 Rigg said she had never watched Game of Thrones, before or after her time on the show.

During autumn 2019, Rigg was filming the role of Mrs Pumphrey at Broughton Hall, near Skipton, for All Creatures Great and Small. Rigg died after filming of the first season had been completed. Her final performance is the British psychological horror film Last Night in Soho, where she played the main villain and elder version of Anya Taylor-Joy’s character, posing with Thomasin McKenzie. The film was in production in London where she also died and is dedicated to the memory of Rigg.

Personal life

In the 1960s, Rigg lived for eight years with director Philip Saville, gaining attention in the tabloid press when she disclaimed interest in marrying the older and already-married Saville, saying that she had no desire "to be respectable". She was married to Menachem Gueffen, an Israeli painter, from 1973 until their divorce in 1976 and to Archibald Stirling, a theatrical producer and former officer in the Scots Guards, from 25 March 1982 until their divorce in 1990 after his affair with the actress Joely Richardson. With Stirling, Rigg had a daughter, actress Rachael Stirling, who was born in 1977, five years before their marriage.

Rigg was a patron of International Care & Relief and was for many years the public face of the charity's child-sponsorship scheme. She was also chancellor of the University of Stirling, a ceremonial rather than executive role, and was succeeded by James Naughtie when her 10-year term of office ended on 31 July 2008.

Michael Parkinson, who first interviewed Rigg in 1972, described her as the most desirable woman he ever met and who "radiated a lustrous beauty". A smoker from the age of 18, Rigg was still smoking 20 cigarettes (one pack) a day in 2009. By December 2017, she had stopped smoking after serious illness led to heart surgery, a cardiac ablation, two months earlier. She joked later, "My heart had stopped ticking during the procedure, so I was up there and the good Lord must have said, 'Send the old bag down again, I'm not having her yet!'"

In a June 2015 interview with the website The A.V. Club, Rigg talked about her chemistry with Patrick Macnee on The Avengers despite their 16-year age difference: "I sort of vaguely knew Patrick Macnee, and he looked kindly on me and sort of husbanded me through the first couple of episodes. After that, we became equal, and loved each other professionally and sparked off each other. And we'd then improvise, write our own lines. They trusted us. Particularly our scenes when we were finding a dead body—I mean, another dead body. How do you get round that one? They allowed us to do it." Asked if she had stayed in touch with Macnee (the interview was published two days before Macnee's death and decades after they were reunited on her short-lived American series Diana): "You'll always be close to somebody that you worked with very intimately for so long, and you become really fond of each other. But we haven't seen each other for a very, very long time."

Death
Rigg died at her daughter's home in London on 10 September 2020, aged 82. Her daughter, Rachael Stirling, said that the cause of death was cancer, which had been diagnosed in March.

Honours
In 2014, Rigg received the Will Award, presented by the Shakespeare Theatre Company, along with Stacy Keach and John Hurt.

On 25 October 2015, to mark 50 years of Emma Peel, the British Film Institute screened an episode of The Avengers; this was followed by an onstage interview with Rigg about her time in the television series.

Commonwealth honours

Scholastic
 Chancellor, visitor, governor, rector and fellowships

Honorary degrees

Credits
Sources:

Theatre
Selected.

Film

Television

Awards and nominations

See also
 No Turn Unstoned, a collection of scathing theatrical reviews collected by Rigg, first published in 1982.

References

External links

 Diana Rigg at the British Film Institute
 
 

 
 
 

1938 births
2020 deaths
20th-century English actresses
21st-century English actresses
Actors from Doncaster
Actresses awarded damehoods
Actresses from Yorkshire
Alumni of RADA
Audiobook narrators
Best Actress BAFTA Award (television) winners
Dames Commander of the Order of the British Empire
Deaths from cancer in England
English Christians
English Shakespearean actresses
English film actresses
English stage actresses
English television actresses
English voice actresses
Fellows of St Catherine's College, Oxford
Outstanding Performance by a Supporting Actress in a Miniseries or Movie Primetime Emmy Award winners
People associated with the University of Stirling
People educated at Fulneck School
Royal Shakespeare Company members
Tony Award winners